El Periódico de Catalunya, also simply known as El Periódico, is a morning daily newspaper based in Barcelona, Catalonia, Spain.

The paper publishes separate daily editions in Spanish and in Catalan. The two editions combined sell more than 125,000 copies per day, making El Periódico the second highest-circulated newspaper in Spain's Catalan-speaking regions, behind La Vanguardia which also publishes in both languages. Nationally, El Periódico was Spain's fifth-highest circulation general-interest daily in 2011.

History and profile 
El Periódico was first published on 26 October 1978 by Antonio Asensio Pizarro to offer a progressive Catalan paper connected to Catalan socialism.  The first editor was Antonio Franco. The paper has also center-left stance. The paper was owned by Grupo Zeta, which was purchased by Prensa Ibérica in May 2019.

One of the most recent directors, Rafael Nadal, is the brother of the Catalan socialist leader Joaquim Nadal. Originally, El Periódico printed only in Spanish, but began a Catalan-language edition on 27 October 1997. Today, the separate editions are distinguished by the red front-page nameplate on the Spanish version of El Periódico and the blue nameplate on the Catalan edition.

El Periódico is regarded as easier to read than its competitors and it is quite popular among working-class people. Following the example of USA Today, El Periódico later began to emphasize graphics and the use of color. Today, it prints every page in color and makes liberal use of charts and photos.

Circulation 

The circulation of El Periódico de Catalunya was 185,517 copies in 1993 and 193,576 copies in 1994. Its circulation was 218,000 copies in 2000. The paper had a circulation of 167,000 copies in 2003. The 2008 circulation of the paper was 152,025 copies. The paper had a circulation of 133,265 copies in 2009 and 133,035 copies in 2010. It was 119,374 copies in 2011.

References

External links 
 El Periódico in Spanish
 El Periódico in Catalan
 Grupo Zeta website
 

1978 establishments in Spain
Catalan-language newspapers
Centre-left newspapers
Newspapers published in Barcelona
Daily newspapers published in Spain
Liberal media
Newspapers established in 1978
Social democratic media
Spanish-language newspapers
Spanish-language websites
Spanish news websites